Travian Smith (born August 26, 1975 in Shepherd, Texas) is a former American football linebacker in the National Football League. He was drafted by the Oakland Raiders in the fifth round of the 1998 NFL Draft. He played college football at Oklahoma.

Smith played for the Raiders from 1998 to 2004.

1975 births
Living people
People from Shepherd, Texas
American football linebackers
Oklahoma Sooners football players
Oakland Raiders players